Ralph Appelbaum Associates (RAA) is one of the world's longest-established and largest museum exhibition design firms with offices in New York City, London, Beijing, Berlin, Moscow, and Dubai.

Overview
The firm was founded in 1978 by Ralph Appelbaum (born 1942), a graduate of Pratt Institute and former Peace Corps volunteer (in Peru). Appelbaum currently directs RAA's undertakings, and retains daily involvement in selected commissions.

The New York Times reported in 1999 that the firm was composed of "architects, designers, editors, model builders, historians, childhood specialists, one poet, one painter and one astrophysicist."

The company's best-known project is the United States Holocaust Memorial Museum in Washington, D.C., which is the United States' official memorial to the Holocaust. Established in 1993, the museum has been described as a "turning point in museology".

Major projects

Selected works

See also

Local Projects, U.S. firm
Event Communications, U.K. firm
Gallagher & Associates, U.S. firm
Xenario, Shanghai/U.S. firm
Cultural tourism
Exhibit design
Exhibition designer

References

External links
 Ralph Appelbaum Associates website

1978 establishments in New York (state)
Design companies established in 1978
Companies based in New York City
Museum companies
Museum designers
Exhibition designers
Environmental design
American companies established in 1978